The Protorthoptera are an extinct order of Palaeozoic insects, and represent a wastebasket taxon and paraphyletic assemblage of basal neoptera. They appear during the Middle Carboniferous (late Serpukhovian or early Bashkirian), making them among the earliest known winged insects in the fossil record. Pronotal lobes may be expanded to form a shield. The group includes the ancestors of all other polyneopterous insects.

Families and genera
Protorthoptera 
 †Adeloneuridae 
 †Adeloneura 
 †Anthracoptilidae 
 †Anthracoptilus 
 †Anthracothremmidae 
 †Anthracothremma 
 †Melinophlebia 
 †Pericalyphe 
 †Silphion 
 †Apithanidae 
 †Apithanus 
 †Asyncritidae 
 †Asyncritus 
 †Blattinopsidae  (synonym Oryctoblattinidae )
 †Blattinopsis 
 †Glaphyrokoris 
 †Glaphyrophlebia 
 †Protoblattiniella 
 †Cheliphlebidae 
 †Cheliphlebia 
 †Cymbopsidae 
 †Cymbopsis 
 †Epimastacidae
 †Eucaenidae  (synonym Teneopteridae)
 †Eucaenus 
 †Hadentomidae  (synonym Hadentomoidea )
 †Fabreciella
 †Fayoliella
 †Hadentomum 
 †Palaeocixius
 †Hapalopteridae  (synonym Aenigmatodidae  & Hapalopteroidea )
 †Aenigmatodes 
 †Hapaloptera 
 †Heteroptilidae 
 †Heteroptilon 
 †Homalophlebiidae 
 †Homalophlebia 
 †Parahomalophlebia 
 †Homoeodictyidae
 †Homoeodictyon 
 †Pachytylopsidae
 †Pachytylopsis 
 †Protopachytylopsis 
 †Symballophlebia 
 †Stenoneuridae
 †Eoblattina 
 †Stenoneura 
 †Stereopteridae 
 †Stereopterum 
 †Strephocladidae 
 †Homocladus 
 †Paracladus 
 †Strephocladus 
 †Stygnidae 
 †Stygne 
 †Thoronysididae
 †Thoronysis 
 †Incertae sedis
 †Acridites 
 †Adiphlebia 
 †Agogoblattina 
 †Anthrakoris 
 †Archaeologus 
 †Archimastax 
 †Atava 
 †Axiologus 
 †Chrestotes 
 †Commentrya 
 †Didymophleps 
 †Endoiasmus 
 †Geraroides 
 †Gyrophlebia 
 †Hemerista 
 †Lecopterum 
 †Megalometer 
 †Metacheliphlebia 
 †Miamia 
 †Polyetes 
 †Pruvostia 
 †Pseudogerarus 
 †Pseudopolyernus 
 †Ptenodera 
 †Schuchertiella

References

 Carpenter, F. M. 1992. Superclass Hexapoda. Volume 3 of Part R, Arthropoda 4; Treatise on Invertebrate Paleontology, Boulder, Colorado, Geological Society of America. 
 

Carboniferous insects
Extinct insect orders
Taxa named by Anton Handlirsch
Paraphyletic groups
Polyneoptera